Federal Route 71, or Jalan Beruas-Ayer Tawar, is a federal road in Perak, Malaysia. The roads connects Beruas in the north to Ayer Tawar in the south.

Route background 
The Kilometre Zero of the Federal Route 71 starts at Ayer Tawar junctions.

Features

At most sections, the Federal Route 71 was built under the JKR R5 road standard, with a speed limit of 90 km/h.

List of junctions and town

References

Malaysian Federal Roads